Anakkavur is an administrative division in the Tiruvannamalai District of Tamil Nadu State, India. Headquartered in Anakkavoor town, the official language spoken in Anakkavoor is Tamil.

References

Tiruvannamalai district